The USSR Chess Championship was played from 1921 to 1991. Organized by the USSR Chess Federation, it was the strongest national chess championship ever held, with eight world chess champions and four world championship finalists among its winners. It was held as a round-robin tournament with the exception of the 35th and 58th championships, which were of the Swiss system.

Most wins 
Six titles: Mikhail Botvinnik, Mikhail Tal
Four titles: Tigran Petrosian, Viktor Korchnoi, Alexander Beliavsky
Three titles: Paul Keres, Leonid Stein, Anatoly Karpov

List of winners 

{|class="wikitable"
|-
! Edition !! Date !! Place !! Winner !! Score !! width=700| Notes
|-
|1 ||4–24 Oct 1920 || Moscow
| Alexander Alekhine || 12/15 (+9−0=6)
|Known as the All-Russian Chess Olympiad at the time, this tournament was later recognized as the first USSR championship.
|-
|2 ||8–24 Jul 1923 || Petrograd
| Peter Romanovsky ||10/12 (+9−1=2)
|
|-
|3 ||23 Aug–15 Sep 1924 || Moscow
|Efim Bogoljubov || 15/17 (+13−0=4)
|
|-
|4 ||11 Aug–6 Sep 1925 ||Leningrad
| Efim Bogoljubov ||14/19 (+11−2=6)
|
|-
|5||26 Sep–25 Oct 1927 || |Moscow
|Fedor BogatyrchukPeter Romanovsky
|14½/20 (+10−1=9)14½/20 (+12−3=5)
|All of Bogatyrchuk's tournament results were erased from Soviet records after he emigrated to Canada and was declared a nonperson.
|-
|6 || 2–20 Sep 1929 || Odessa
|Boris Verlinsky || 5½/8 (+4−1=3),4/5 (+4−1=0),and 3½/4 (+3−0=1)
|The tournament was conducted in three stages.
|-
|7 || 10 Oct–11 Nov 1931 || Moscow
|Mikhail Botvinnik || 13½/17 (+12−2=3)
|
|-
|8|| 16 Aug–9 Sep 1933 || Leningrad
| Mikhail Botvinnik || 14/19 (+11−2=6)
|
|-
|9 || 7 Dec 1934–2 Jan 1935 || Leningrad
|Grigory Levenfish Ilya Rabinovich
|12/19 (+8−3=8)12/19 (+9−4=6)
|
|-
|10 || 12 Apr–14 May 1937 || Tbilisi
| Grigory Levenfish || 12½/19 (+9−3=7)
|
|-
|11 || 15 Apr–16 May 1939 || Leningrad
| Mikhail Botvinnik || 12½/17 (+8−0=9)
|
|-
|12|| 5 Sep–3 Oct 1940 || Moscow
|Andor LilienthalIgor Bondarevsky
|13½/19 (+8−0=11)13½/19 (+10−2=7)
| Mikhail Botvinnik won the Absolute Championship,23 Mar–29 Apr 1941, Leningrad/Moscow, 13½/20 (+9−2=9)
|-
|13 || 21 May–17 Jun 1944 || Moscow
| Mikhail Botvinnik || 12½/16 (+11−2=3)
|
|-
|14 || 1 Jun–3 Jul 1945 || |Moscow
| Mikhail Botvinnik ||15/17 (+13−0=4)
|
|-
|15 ||2 Feb–8 Mar 1947 || Leningrad
|Paul Keres || 14/19 (+10−1=8)
|
|-
|16||10 Nov–13 Dec 1948 || Moscow
|David BronsteinAlexander Kotov
|12/18 (+7−1=10)12/18 (+10−4=4)
|
|-
|17 || 16 Oct–20 Nov 1949 || Moscow
|Vasily SmyslovDavid Bronstein
|13/19 (+9−2=8)13/19 (+8−1=10)
|
|-
|18 || 10 Nov–12 Dec 1950 || Moscow
|Paul Keres || 11½/17 (+8−2=7)
|
|-
|19 || 11 Nov–14 Dec 1951 || Moscow
|Paul Keres ||12/17 (+9−2=6)
|
|-
|20 || 29 Nov–29 Dec 1952 || Moscow
|Mikhail Botvinnik ||13½/19 (+9−1=9)
|Botvinnik defeated Mark Taimanov in a playoff +2−1=3.
|-
|21 || 7 Jan–7 Feb 1954 || Kyiv
|Yuri Averbakh || 14½/19 (+10−0=9)
|
|-
|22 || 11 Feb–15 Mar 1955 || Moscow
|Efim Geller || 12/19 (+10−5=4)
|Geller defeated Vasily Smyslov in a playoff +1=6.
|-
|23 || 10 Jan–15 Feb 1956 || Leningrad
|Mark Taimanov || 11½/17 (+8−2=7)
|Taimanov defeated Boris Spassky and Yuri Averbakh in a playoff.
|-
|24 || 20 Jan–22 Feb 1957 || Moscow
|Mikhail Tal ||14/21 (+9−2=10)
|
|-
|25 || 12 Jan–14 Feb 1958 ||Riga
|Mikhail Tal ||12½/18 (+10−3=5)
|
|-
|26 || 9 Jan–11 Feb 1959 || Tbilisi
|Tigran Petrosian ||13½/19 (+8−0=11)
|
|-
|27 || 26 Jan–26 Feb 1960 || Leningrad
|Viktor Korchnoi ||14/19 (+12−3=4)
|
|-
|28 || 11 Jan–11 Feb 1961 ||Moscow
|Tigran Petrosian ||13½/19 (+9−1=9)
|
|-
|29 ||16 Nov–12 Dec 1961 ||Baku
|Boris Spassky ||14½/20 (+10−1=9)
|
|-
|30 || 21 Nov–20 Dec 1962 ||Yerevan
|Viktor Korchnoi || 14/19 (+10−1=8)
|
|-
|31 || 23 Nov–27 Dec 1963 || Leningrad
|Leonid Stein || 12/19 (+6−1=12)
|Stein defeated Boris Spassky and Ratmir Kholmov in a playoff.
|-
|32 ||25 Dec 1964–27 Jan 1965 || Kyiv
|Viktor Korchnoi ||15/19 (+11−0=8)
|
|-
|33 || 21 Nov–24 Dec 1965 || Tallinn
|Leonid Stein ||14/19 (+10−1=8)
|
|-
|34 ||28 Dec 1966 – 2 Feb 1967 ||Tbilisi
|Leonid Stein ||13/20 (+8−2=10)
|
|-
|35 ||7–26 Dec 1967 ||Kharkiv
|Lev PolugaevskyMikhail Tal ||10/1310/13
|The tournament was a 126-player Swiss.
|-
|36 ||30 Dec 1968–1 Feb 1969 ||Alma-Ata
| Lev PolugaevskyAlexander Zaitsev
|12½/19 (+7−1=11)12½/19 (+6=13)
|Polugaevsky defeated Zaitsev in a playoff +2−1=3.
|-
|37 || 6 Sep–12 Oct 1969 ||Moscow
|Tigran Petrosian ||14/22 (+6−0=16)
|Petrosian defeated Polugaevsky in a playoff held in Feb 1970 by +2=3.
|-
|38 || 25 Nov–28 Dec 1970 || Riga
|Viktor Korchnoi ||16/21 (+12−1=8)
|
|-
|39 ||15 Sep–17 Oct 1971 || Leningrad
|Vladimir Savon || 15/21 (+9−0=12)
|
|-
|40 || 16 Nov–19 Dec 1972 || Baku
| Mikhail Tal || 15/21 (+9−0=12)
|
|-
|41 || 1–27 Oct 1973 || Moscow
| Boris Spassky ||11½/17 (+7−1=9)
|
|-
|42 || 30 Nov–23 Dec 1974 || Leningrad
|Alexander BeliavskyMikhail Tal ||9½/15 (+6−2=7)9½/15 (+6−2=7)
|
|-
|43 || 28 Nov–22 Dec 1975 || Yerevan
| Tigran Petrosian || 10/15 (+6−1=8)
|
|-
|44
|26 Nov–24 Dec 1976 || Moscow
|Anatoly Karpov || 12/17 (+8−1=8)
|
|-
|45 || 28 Nov–22 Dec 1977 || Leningrad
|Boris GulkoIosif Dorfman || 9½/15 (+4−0=11)9½/15 (+4−0=11)
|A playoff, held in 1978, was drawn +1−1=4.
|-
|46 || 1–28 Dec 1978 || Tbilisi
|Mikhail TalVitaly Tseshkovsky
|11/17 (+5−0=12)11/17 (+6−1=10)
|
|-
|47 || 29 Nov–27 Dec 1979 || Minsk
| Efim Geller || 11½/17 (+6−0=11)
|
|-
|48 || 25 Dec 1980–21 Jan 1981 || Vilnius
|Lev PsakhisAlexander Beliavsky
| 10½/17 (+8−4=5)10½/17 (+6−2=9)
|
|-
|49 || 27 Nov–22 Dec 1981 || Frunze
|Garry KasparovLev Psakhis
|12½/17 (+10−2=5)12½/17 (+9−1=7)
|
|-
|50 || 2–28 Apr 1983 || Moscow
| Anatoly Karpov || 9½/15 (+5−1=9)
|
|-
|51 || 2–28 Apr 1984 || Lviv
|Andrei Sokolov || 12½/17 (+8−0=9)
|
|-
|52 || 22 Jan–19 Feb 1985 || Riga
|Viktor GavrikovMikhail GurevichAlexander Chernin
|11/19 (+4−1=14)11/19 (+6−3=10)11/19 (+5−2=12)
|
|-
|53 || 4–28 Feb 1986 || Kyiv
| Vitaly Tseshkovsky || 11/17 (+6−1=10)
|
|-
|54 || 4–29 Mar 1987 || Minsk
| Alexander Beliavsky || 11/17 (+7−2=8)
|Beliavsky defeated Valery Salov in a playoff +2=2.
|-
|55 || 25 Jul–19 Aug 1988 || Moscow
| Anatoly KarpovGarry Kasparov
|11½/17 (+6−0=11)11½/17 (+6−0=11)
|
|-
|56 || 22 Sep–16 Oct 1989 || Odessa
|Rafael Vaganian || 9/15 (+5−2=8)
|
|-
|57 || 18 Oct–3 Nov 1990 || Leningrad
|Alexander BeliavskyLeonid YudasinEvgeny BareevAlexey Vyzmanavin
|8½/13 (+5−1=7)8½/13 (+4−0=9)8½/13 (+6−2=5)8½/13 (+5−1=7)
|
|-
|58 || 1–13 Nov 1991 || Moscow
|Artashes Minasian || 8½/11 (+7−1=3)
|Minasian won this Swiss-style tournament on tiebreak over Elmar Magerramov.
|}

See also
 Women's Soviet Chess Championship
 Russian Chess Championship

Publications
 Mark Taimanov, Bernard Cafferty, Soviet Championships, London, Everyman Chess, 1998

References

Further reading

The Soviet Chess Championship 1920-1991
 RUSBASE (part V) 1919-1937,1991-1994
 RUSBASE (part IV) 1938-1960
 RUSBASE (part III), 1961-1969,1985-1990
 RUSBASE (part II) 1970-1984

 
Chess national championships
Championship
Chess
Recurring sporting events established in 1920
Recurring events disestablished in 1991